Pavel Hezoučký (born 11 March 2000) is a retired Czech footballer who last played as a forward for Senica in Fortuna Liga. Hezoučký retired in the autumn of 2021 due to epilepsy.

Club career

FK Senica
Hezoučký made his Fortuna Liga debut for Senica in an away fixture against Ružomberok. Hezoučký remained in play for 54 minutes before being replaced by Giannis Niarchos.

References

External links
 

2000 births
Living people
Sportspeople from České Budějovice
Czech footballers
Czech Republic youth international footballers
Association football defenders
FC Viktoria Plzeň players
FC Slavoj Vyšehrad players
FK Senica players
Bohemian Football League players
Czech National Football League players
Slovak Super Liga players
Expatriate footballers in Slovakia
Czech expatriate sportspeople in Slovakia
People with epilepsy